|-
| Njeganovići
| Bileća
|
|-
| Njemanica
| Stari Grad, Sarajevo
|
|-
| Njivak
| Gradačac
|
|-
| Njuhe
| Foča
|
|}

Lists of settlements in the Federation of Bosnia and Herzegovina (A-Ž)